Catherine Ribeiro (born 22 September 1941) is a French singer. Ribeiro is an experimental folk and avant-garde performer whose work has attained a cult following. With her band Catherine Ribeiro + Alpes, she released several albums in the late 1960s and early 1970s, including Catherine Ribeiro & 2Bis in 1969, No.2 in 1970, and Paix in 1972. Since the late 1970s, Ribeiro has also released music as a solo artist. Public figures who have expressed appreciation for her work include the musicians Kim Gordon and Julian Cope, as well as the French mathematician Cédric Villani.

Discography

Studio albums 
With Alpes

 Catherine Ribeiro + 2bis (1969)
 N°2 (also known as Catherine Ribeiro + Alpes) (1970)
 Âme debout (1971)
 Paix (1972)
 Le Rat débile et l'Homme des champs (1974)
 Libertés ? (1975)
 Le Temps de l'autre (1977)
 Passions (1979)
 La Déboussole (1980)

Solo

 Le Blues de Piaf (1977)
 Jacqueries (1978)
 Soleil dans l'ombre (1982)
 Percuphonante... (1986)
 1989... déjà ! (1988)
 Fenêtre ardente (1993)

Live albums 

 L'amour aux nus (1992)
 Vivre libre (1995)
 Chansons de légende (1997)
 Live au Théâtre Toursky (2002)
 Catherine Ribeiro chante Ribeiro Alpes (2006)
 Catherine Ribeiro chante Ribeiro Alpes Live intégral (2007)

EPs 

 Dieu me pardonne (1965)
 Le Chasseur (1966)
 La nuit et le vent (1966)
 Lorsque le bateau viendra (1967)
 Vivre libre (promotional CD) (1995)

Singles 

 "Aria" / "La solitude" (1969; Festival 878), with 2bis
 "Sœur de race" / "Voyage 1" (1969; Festival SPX 79), with 2bis
 "Thème en bref" / "Silen Voy Kathy" (1970; Festival SPX 128), recorded live at the Port Leucate festival in July 1970 with Alpes
 "Jusqu'à ce que la force de t'aimer me manque" / "Roc Alpin" (1972; Philips 6837 102), with Alpes
 "La petite fille aux fraises" / "L'ère de la putréfaction" (1974; Philips 6837 208), with Alpes
 "Un regard clair (obscur)" / "L'ère de la putréfaction" (1974; Philips 6837 223), with Alpes
 "Une infinie tendresse" / "Prélude médiéval" (1975; Festival 6837 288), with Alpes
 "Les Partisans" / "La Varsovienne" (1976; Philips 6042 243), with the Choirs of the Soviet Army
 "Dernière sortie avant Roissy" / "Le bonheur tout de suite" (1977; Philips (6172 036), soundtrack from the film by Bernard Paul
 "Hymne à l'amour" / "Les amants d'un jour" (1977; Philips 6837 442)
 "Chanson de la ville à prendre" / "Aria populaire" (1979; Fontana 6172 763), soundtrack from the film by Patrick Brunie
 "Amour petite flamme" / "Dans le creux de ta nuit" (1982; Philips 6010 618)
 "Jour de fête" / "Carrefour de la solitude" (1982; Philips 841 267-7)
 "Guet-apens" / "Sans amarres" (1982; Philips 6010.515)
 "Plus de reproches" / "Insoumission mondiale" (1986; Phonogram)
 "Elles" / "Soleil" (1986; Ioana Melodies 020)
 "Stress et strass" / "Le Cerf-volant" (1993; Mantra)

Filmography

References

Footnotes

Citations

External links
 Official Site

Living people
20th-century French women singers
French people of Portuguese descent
1941 births
Musicians from Lyon